IPA Braille is the modern standard Braille encoding of the International Phonetic Alphabet (IPA), as recognized by the International Council on English Braille.

A braille version of the IPA was first created by Merrick and Potthoff in 1934, and published in London. It was used in France, Germany, and anglophone countries. However, it was not updated as the IPA evolved, and by 1989 had become obsolete. In 1990 it was officially reissued by BAUK, but in a corrupted form that made it largely unworkable. In 1997 BANA created a completely new system for the United States and Canada. However, it was incompatible with braille IPA elsewhere in the world and in addition proved to be cumbersome and often inadequate. In 2008 Robert Englebretson revised the Merrick and Potthoff notation and by 2011 this had been accepted by BANA. It is largely true to the original in consonants and vowels, though the diacritics were completely reworked, as necessitated by the major revisions in print IPA diacritics since 1934. The diacritics were also made more systematic, and follow rather than precede the base letters. However, it has no general procedure for marking tone, and not all diacritics can be written.

IPA Braille does not use the conventions of English Braille. It is set off by slash or square brackets, which indicate that the intervening material is IPA rather than national orthography. Thus brackets are required in braille even when not used in print.

Basic letters
The 26 letters of the basic Latin alphabet are the same as in international braille:

In addition, there are the following dedicated letters:

Following a pattern found in many national alphabets, a few braille letters are reversed to represent a similar letter: thus reversed  produces . The choice for  may reflect the shape of that letter in print. Many of the vowels are used for modified vowels in national alphabets, such as French Braille.

A few other letters such as  occur, but only as parts of digraphs.

Modified letters
Other IPA letters are indicated with digraphs or even trigraphs usinɡ 5th-decade letters (letters from the punctuation row). The component letter  ".", for example, is equivalent to the tail of the retroflex consonants, deriving from the old IPA convention of a subscript dot for retroflex. It also marks vowels which in print are formed by rotating the letter.

 is used for fricatives written with Greek letters, using the English conventions for Greek letters in scientific notation.

 is also used with letters of the fifth decade for transcriber-defined symbols, which need to be specified for each text, as they have no set meaning.

 is used for barred vowels.

 is used for other hooks, as in flaps, as well as a couple barred and turned letters.

 is used for click letters. These are far more legible in braille than in print, and there is no distinction from the old click letters.

Diacritics 
IPA Braille diacritics are written in two cells. The first indicates the position: whether superscript, mid-line, or subscript. As noted above, dot 5 is used for the tie bar; the only diacritics which use it are the rhotic and ejective (apostrophe) diacritics seen above, and the velar/pharyngeal tilde just illustrated.

In other cases, such as the ring for voiceless , a diacritic may superscript or subscript with no change in meaning. The distinction is therefore not necessary in braille, but can be maintained if the text is to be transliterated into print. The placement dot distinguishes the tilde from the letter , and the ring from the letter . Many diacritics are identical in form to the corresponding symbols in Unified English Braille, but always follow the letter in IPA Braille. When there is more than one diacritic, they are written in the order lowest to highest.

Superscript letters are simply the superscript placement dot plus the base letter. The other diacritics are as follows; any of these may be modified by a change in placement:

The high and low falling-tone diacritics are extrapolated from the rising-tone diacritics, the dipping tone by analogy with the peaking tone and the generic rising and falling tones.

Non-combining modifiers 
 marks tone letters, stress, and prosody.

There is no general provision for IPA tone letters. Ligatures which did not happen to have been chosen as illustrations in the 2005 edition of the IPA summary chart, such as the Mandarin dipping tone  and various other tones used in the IPA Handbook, are not covered. The high and low falling tone letters above are extrapolated from the high and low rising tone letters.  transcribes peaking (rising–falling) tones in general, and so has no exact print equivalent; the parallel dipping tone may be expected from the patterns elsewhere. There is no explicit provision for use of the ligature mark to create additional tone letters, nor whether the tone-marker  would need to be repeated for each component.

Punctuation and code switching 
The only punctuation which is defined is the period (syllable break, full stop), comma (pause), hyphen (morpheme break), and rightward arrow (phonological realization).

For all other punctuation, you must opt out of IPA coding.

The primary indication of IPA coding are the brackets, square or slash depending on whether the transcription is phonetic or phonemic. These are marked by :

 opts out of IPA. A single instance indicates that the following cell is to be read in the national orthography. Doubled, it indicates that the following string is to be read in orthography, up to the opt-in indicator , which marks the end of the non-IPA passage. These are only used for non-IPA (or nonstandard IPA) strings within IPA brackets. An example is the use of parentheses to mark an optional consonant or vowel, since parentheses are not defined for IPA Braille.

Notes

References

External links
 IPA Braille

Braille symbols
International Phonetic Alphabet